Omar Jawo (born 8 November 1981 in Banjul) is a Gambian-Swedish footballer who plays as a defender.

Career
Jawo began his youth career with Assyriska FF. He earned his first two professional caps with the squad in 2002, before signing with IK Frej in 2003. After one season with IK Frej he was sold to Vallentuna BK where he played one year. He signed than in February 2005 for Väsby United and played 80 games, who scored four goals before signed in February 2009 for Gefle IF. In 2016, he signed a one-year contract with Brommapojkarna.

Personal life
Omar's brother Amadou Jawo plays currently for Stockholm based Djurgårdens IF. His two youngest brothers, Momodou Jawo and Ebrima "Mabou" Jawo are also footballers.

References

External links

Brommapojkarna profile

1981 births
Living people
Sportspeople from Banjul
Gambian footballers
Association football defenders
The Gambia international footballers
Gambian emigrants to Sweden
Naturalized citizens of Sweden
Swedish footballers
Assyriska FF players
Gefle IF players
Syrianska FC players
AFC Eskilstuna players
IK Frej players
IF Brommapojkarna players
Allsvenskan players
Swedish people of Gambian descent